Mera Faisla is a 1984 Indian Hindi-language film directed by Rajendra Singh Babu. The movie stars Sanjay Dutt, Rati Agnihotri, Jaya Prada in pivotal roles. It was a commercial failure.

Cast

 Sanjay Dutt as Raj Saxena
 Rati Agnihotri as Rati Verma
 Jaya Prada as Nisha Dhawan
 Nirupa Roy as Mrs. Saxena 
 Shakti Kapoor as Tony
 Kader Khan as Jacob
 Pran as Police Commissioner Rana
 Parikshit Sahni as Inspector Anand Saxena
 Pinchoo Kapoor as Major Verma
 Satyen Kappu as Dhawan
 Shubha Khote as Girls Hostel Warden Principal
 Yunus Parvez as Boys Hostel Warden Principal
 Rajendra Nath as Jaleel Miyan
 Asrani as Photographer

Soundtrack
Lyrics: Anand Bakshi

Production
Sanjay Dutt sporting women's outfits in one of the scenes was called a "dreadful" act by Mid-Day.

References

External links
 

1984 films
1980s Hindi-language films
Films scored by Laxmikant–Pyarelal
Films directed by Rajendra Singh Babu
Indian action drama films
Cross-dressing in Indian films
1980s action drama films